Zhang Ling  is a Chinese rhythmic gymnast. She competed in the group rhythmic gymnastics competition at the 2016 Summer Olympics, where the team was eliminated in the qualification round.

References

Living people
1992 births
Chinese rhythmic gymnasts
Gymnasts at the 2016 Summer Olympics
Olympic gymnasts of China
People from Jinhua
Gymnasts from Zhejiang
21st-century Chinese women